Thundering Gun Slingers is a 1944 American Western film directed by Sam Newfield and written by Fred Myton. The film stars Buster Crabbe, Al St. John, Frances Gladwin, Charles King, Jack Ingram and Karl Hackett. The film was released on March 25, 1944, by Producers Releasing Corporation.

Plot
A man has been murdered. Lynched as a falsely accused cattle rustler. The man's nephew, Billy Carson (Buster Crabbe) comes looking for the murders, and finds Steve Kirby (Charles King) holding a forged claim on his uncle's ranch. When Kirby is confronted, he frames Carson for murder. As Carson is jailed, and Kirby incites a lynch mob, Carson's new friend, Doc Jones, arrives to even the odds.

Cast          
Buster Crabbe as Billy Carson
Al St. John as Doc Fuzzy Jones 
Frances Gladwin as Beth Halliday
Charles King as Steve Kirby
Jack Ingram as Vic Dawson 
Karl Hackett as Jeff Halliday
Kermit Maynard as Ed Slade 
Budd Buster as Sheriff
George Chesebro as Dave Carson

References

External links
 

1944 films
American Western (genre) films
1944 Western (genre) films
Producers Releasing Corporation films
Films directed by Sam Newfield
1940s English-language films
1940s American films